The 2009 Qatar GP2 Asia Series round was a GP2 Asia Series motor race held on 13 and 14 February 2009 at Losail International Circuit in Lusail, Qatar. It was the fourth round of the 2008–09 GP2 Asia Series.

Classification

Qualifying

Feature race

Sprint race

Standings after the event 

Drivers' Championship standings

Teams' Championship standings

 Note: Only the top five positions are included for both sets of standings.

See also 
 2009 Qatar Speedcar Series round

References

GP2 Asia Series
GP2 Asia
GP2 Asia